The Bridge is an American drama television series developed by Meredith Stiehm and Elwood Reid, based on the Danish/Swedish series Broen/Bron created by Hans Rosenfeld, Måns Mårlind and Björn Stein. It premiered on FX on July 10, 2013. The series was canceled after its second season. A total of 26 episodes aired over two seasons.

The series follows two police detectives – Marco Ruiz (Demián Bichir) and Sonya Cross (Diane Kruger) – and their joint effort to investigate a serial killer menacing both nations along the Texas–Chihuahua border. Their investigation is complicated by the rampant corruption and general apathy among the Mexican authorities and the violence of the powerful borderland drug cartels. The show's title refers to the Bridge of the Americas that serves as a border crossing between El Paso, Texas, and Ciudad Juárez, Chihuahua, where the series is set.

Series overview

Episodes

Season 1 (2013)

Season 2 (2014)

References

External links 

Lists of American crime drama television series episodes
The Bridge (TV series)